Daisy Town may refer to:
 Daisy Town (film), a 1971 French-Belgian film based upon the comic book character Lucky Luke
 Daisy Town (comics), a 1983 Lucky Luke comic, adapted from the film